Ana María Rodas (born 1937 in Guatemala City) is a Guatemalan journalist and poet, and an outstanding figure of the Central American literary panorama.

Biography 
Rodas published her first book of poems in 1973. In 1990, she received an honorable mention from the Juegos Florales Hispanoamericanos, a literary contest. In 2000, she was awarded the Guatemala National Prize in Literature.

Her books have been translated into German, English, and Italian.

On September 9, 2017, she received the honor of being named Illustrious Person for her contribution to universal literature, recognition granted during the San Carlos University of Guatemala's three-hundredth anniversary.

Selected works 
 Narrative by Ana María Rodas. Book in Audio Cassette, Ministry of Culture, Guatemala, 1995
 Mariana in the Tigrera, 1996
 The Nun, 2002

References

External links
http://amediavoz.com/rodas.htm
https://web.archive.org/web/20060610105155/http://www.literaturaguatemalteca.org/ Guatemalan  Literature
http://amediavoz.com/rodas.htm

Guatemalan women poets
Guatemalan journalists
1937 births
Government ministers of Guatemala
Guatemalan women writers
Guatemalan women journalists
20th-century Guatemalan poets
20th-century women writers
People from Guatemala City
Living people